The Eurovision Song Contest 1982 was the 27th edition of the annual Eurovision Song Contest. Organised by the European Broadcasting Union (EBU) and host broadcaster British Broadcasting Corporation (BBC), the contest was held at the Harrogate International Centre on 24 April 1982 and was hosted by English TV presenter and newsreader Jan Leeming.

Eighteen countries took part in the contest with  deciding not to enter this year. Due the downsizing of their national broadcasters,  lost the rights to participating at the contest and so was also forced to withdraw.

This was the first time that Germany had won the contest after having competed every year since the contest's inception. The song also cemented Ralph Siegel and Bernd Meinunger, the song's composers, into German Eurovision tradition, writing 18 Eurovision songs between them before and after "Ein bißchen Frieden", 13 of which were for Germany.

Location

Harrogate is a spa town in North Yorkshire, England. Historically in the West Riding of Yorkshire, the town is a tourist destination and its visitor attractions include its spa waters and RHS Harlow Carr gardens. Nearby is the Yorkshire Dales national park and the Nidderdale AONB. Harrogate grew out of two smaller settlements, High Harrogate and Low Harrogate, in the 17th century. The town became known as 'The English Spa' in the Georgian Era, after its waters were discovered in the 16th century. In the 17th and 18th centuries its 'chalybeate' waters (containing iron) were a popular health treatment, and the influx of wealthy but sickly visitors contributed significantly to the wealth of the town.

The Harrogate International Centre was chosen as the host venue for the contest. The grand convention and exhibition centre opened short time prior to the contest, and was the first big event held in the main 2000-seat auditorium.

Format
The opening of the contest showed a map of Europe, with the translation "Where is Harrogate?" popping up on-screen from the languages of the various countries. The question was always in the language in which the respective country's song was performed, with the exception of Ireland. The Irish entry was sung in English, but the translation of the question in the map was in Irish. Then the map zoomed into Harrogate's location in Yorkshire, followed by an introduction video spotlighting the town.

The tradition of previous year's winners handing over the prize to current winners was not followed by Bucks Fizz, winners in 1981.

Irish band Chips lost out in their national finals, which, had they been successful, would have led to the unique situation of two bands in the same Eurovision with the same name (the other being Sweden).

This year, before the postcard of a specific country (with the exceptions of Israel, who had no commentator, and Yugoslavia, whose commentators were in their own country), the camera would zoom into the commentary box of that country's broadcaster, where the commentator/s would give a hand gesture, e.g. wave. The postcard would start with the country's flag on the screen and an excerpt of the country's national anthem (though in the case of the UK, the song played was "Land of Hope and Glory" instead of "God Save the Queen", while the Israeli postcard began with an excerpt of "Hava Nagila" instead of "Hatikvah"). The postcards themselves, utilizing state-of-the-art video technology (for its time), were a montage of footage of the artist in Harrogate town or at the International Flower Festival. Some of the postcards also incorporated footage from the preview videos submitted by each organization, the first time the contest had utilised the clips in the broadcast. Only the preview videos which did not consist of a performance of the song from the national final were used. Also, postcards used either a popular song or tune from the country being shown or a song performed at previous editions of Eurovision (i.e. for the Yugoslav entry, "Jedan dan" from 1968 was used, and for Israel, the winning song "Hallelujah" by Milk and Honey from 1979 was used). After the conclusion of the video clip, Jan Leeming introduced the conductor and then the artist for each nation.

Participating countries 
There were 18 participating countries this year. No year since has had this few participants in the final of the competition.

Greece was due to participate in the contest with the song "Sarantapente kopelies" performed by Themis Adamantidis. Although drawn to perform in second place, ERT withdrew the entry a few weeks before the contest.

In November 1981, France's national broadcaster, TF1, declined to enter the Eurovision Song Contest for 1982, with the head of entertainment, Pierre Bouteiller, saying, "The absence of talent and the mediocrity of the songs is where annoyance sets in. [Eurovision is] a monument to insanity [sometimes translated as "drivel"]." Antenne 2 became the new broadcaster for Eurovision after public outcry, returning the country to the contest in 1983.

Germany had the advantage of performing last. After coming second in The Hague in 1980 and second in Dublin in 1981, Ralph Siegel and Bernd Meinunger took the first win for Germany. The winner, Nicole, beat the nearest competition by 61 points and over 13 million West Germans watched her victory on television. Germany was the commanding leader for nearly the entire voting process.

Nicole went on to sing the reprise of her song in English, French and Dutch, as well as German, to the delight of the invited audience in Harrogate Conference Centre who stood up to applaud her. The English version (also produced by Siegel and ) of her Eurovision winner, A Little Peace, subsequently shot to No. 1 in the UK Singles Chart.

Conductors 
Each performance had a conductor who conducted the orchestra.

 Luis Duarte
 
 Sigurd Jansen
 Ronnie Hazlehurst
 Garo Mafyan
 Ossi Runne
 Joan Amils
 Martyn Ford
 Anders Berglund
 Richard Oesterreicher
 Jack Say
 Miguel Ángel Varona
 Allan Botschinsky
 
 
 Rogier van Otterloo
 Noel Kelehan
 Norbert Daum

Returning artists

Participants and results

Detailed voting results 

Each country had a jury who awarded 12, 10, 8, 7, 6, 5, 4, 3, 2, 1 point(s) for their top ten songs.

12 points 
Below is a summary of all 12 points in the final:

Spokespersons 

Listed below is the order in which votes were cast during the 1982 contest along with the spokesperson who was responsible for announcing the votes for their respective country.

 TBC
 Jacques Harvey
 Erik Diesen
 Colin Berry
 Başak Doğru
 Solveig Herlin
 Michel Stocker
 Anna Partelidou
 Arne Weise
 
 Jacques Olivier
 
 
 Miša Molk
 
 Flip van der Schalie
 John Skehan
 TBC

Broadcasts 

Each participating broadcaster was required to relay the contest via its networks. Non-participating EBU member broadcasters were also able to relay the contest as "passive participants". Broadcasters were able to send commentators to provide coverage of the contest in their own native language and to relay information about the artists and songs to their television viewers. Known details on the broadcasts in each country, including the specific broadcasting stations and commentators are shown in the tables below.

Notes

References

External links

 
1982
Music festivals in the United Kingdom
1982 in music
1982 in the United Kingdom
Events in Harrogate
1980s in North Yorkshire
April 1982 events in Europe